Harry Arthur Gant (February 11, 1881 - July 26, 1967) was a cinematographer and film director whose work includes African American films. He directed for the Lincoln Motion Picture Company. He was the only white person at the film company.

He joined the African American film company after meeting Noble Johnson on a Universal Pictures set. Gant worked at the film company while also continuing to work for a major studio. He was also a stockholder in the fledgling film company. UCLA has a photograph of Gant and Johnson.

Filmography
 Behind the Lines (1916 film), cinematographer
 The Secret of the Swamp (1916), cinematographer
 The Realization of a Negro's Ambition (1916)
The Trooper of Troop K (1916)
A Man's Duty (1919)
 By Right of Birth (1921)

References

External links
 

American film directors
1881 births
1967 deaths